The Mayor of Vijayawada heads Vijayawada Municipal Corporation which governs Indian city of Vijayawada. It is the capital of Indian state of Andhra Pradesh. Mayor of Vijayawada is the first citizen of the city. Municipal Corporation mechanism in India was introduced during British Rule with formation of Madras (Chennai) in 1688, later followed by municipal corporations in Bombay (Mumbai) and Calcutta (Kolkata) by 1762. However the process of introduction for an elected President in the municipalities was made in Lord Mayo's Resolution of 1870. Since than the current form and structure of municipal bodies followed is similar to Lord Ripon's Resolution adopted in 1882 on local self-governance. The 74th Constitutional Amendment Act of 1992 was introduced to recognise Urban Local Bodies (ULBs) which included Municipal Corporations,Nagar Panchayats, Municipal Councils.

Elections and tenure 

Mayor of Vijayawada is elected by elected members of various wards of Municipal Corporation Vijayawada. The political partie's winning members in city's municipal council elections nominates one among each of them to contest for the post of  Mayor of the Corporation. Rayana Bhagya Lakshmi was elected as the 12th Mayor at the first council meeting held after declaration of municipal elections results for Vijayawada Municipal Corporation. She is the fifth woman mayor of the corporation.

Vijayawada Municipal Corporation has 64 wards and each ward is represented by a corporator. Rayana Bhagya Lakshmi representing Yuvajana Sramika Rythu Congress Party (YSRCP), ruling political party of Andhra Pradesh won 49 corporators, opposition Telugu Desam Party won 14 Corporators and one each going to others.

Roles and Responsibilities 

Role of the mayor.

 Governs the local civic body.
 Fixed tenure varying in different towns.
 First citizen of city.
 Has two varied roles —  Representation and upholding of the dignity of the city during ceremonial times and a presiding over discussions of the civic house with elected representatives in functional capacity.
 The Mayor’s role is confined to the corporation hall of presiding authority at various meetings relating to corporation.
 The Mayor’s role extends much beyond the local city and country as the presiding authority at corporation meetings during visits of a  foreign dignitary to the city as he is invited by the state government to receive and represent the citizens to the guest of honour.
 At government, civic and other social functions he is given prominence.

List of mayors

List of mayors

List of deputy mayors of VMC

See also 

 Lists of Indian mayors

References

External links 
 www.example.com

Lists of mayors of places in India

Lists of people from Andhra Pradesh